is a Japanese actor. Ikuta is known for his roles in Hanazakari no Kimitachi e, Honey & Clover, Sensei!, Maō and Ouroboros. He also stars in feature films, notably Hanamizuki, Ningen Shikkaku and Brain Man.

Career
The 2007, Fuji TV summer drama Hanazakari no Kimitachi e, controversial in its gender-bending nature, was perhaps Ikuta's biggest break in Japanese Entertainment. Following his successful portrayal in Hana Kimi, Ikuta was on stage again as he starred in the Shakespearean play, The Two Gentlemen of Verona. While working on this play, Toma was also slated to star in one of Fuji TV's winter dramas for 2008, the live adaptation of Chika Umino's popular manga, Hachimitsu to Kuroba. He took on the role of Yūta Takemoto, a struggling Architecture student in an art school who had mediocre talent and who fell in love at first sight with his professor's niece, Hagumi Hanamoto (played by Riko Narumi). His role as the silent but constant observer that uncovers the events of the drama to the audience earned him another Best Supporting Actor award. Due to the popularity of Hana Kimi, Fuji TV decided to air a special two-hour episode, announcing it in early 2008.

Ikuta's rise to fame brought about another project; this time a double-lead with Arashi's leader Satoshi Ohno, in the Japanese adaptation of the Korean drama Mawang. The drama, called Maō, is about a lawyer, Ryo Naruse (played by Ohno) who seeks to avenge the death of his younger brother several years ago. On the other hand, Serizawa Naoto is the brash and impulsive detective (played by Ikuta), who is atoning for the grave, juvenile crime he had committed in the past. In October 2008, Ikuta was back on stage again, playing the role of Danny in the Japanese version of the musical "Grease". January 2009 marked Ikuta's first ever appearance in Fuji TV's peak slot for dramas, Ishimatsu Ryosuke, an intern forensics specialist in the serial drama Voice, along with Eita and Satomi Ishihara. Following his streak of solo projects, Ikuta was again named to star in a Fuji TV drama even while Voice was airing, this time a lead role in the timely jury drama Majo Saiban: The Witch Trial, for the TV station's spring 2009 late night Saturday drama. He plays Yoshioka Tōru, a freeter who was chosen as one of the members of the jury that will participate in the trial of a woman accused of killing her husband. Foul play comes into the picture as the members of the jury begin to be threatened. When the life of one of the jury members, a housewife (played by Ai Kato) is also endangered, Tooru tries to help. This raises suspicions with his girlfriend (played by Manami Higa) who becomes afraid Tooru might be cheating on her. Thus begins Tōru's lone search for the truth. The drama aired on April 25, 2009, a month before the jury system was to be implemented in Japan.

Ikuta finally made his silver screen debut with Ningen Shikkaku, a spring 2010 movie adaptation of Dazai Osamu's masterpiece of the same title. Considered a semi-autobiographical novel, Ikuta plays the role of Oba Yozo, a troubled soul who is forced to keep up a facade of hollow jocularity in his everyday life. The book cover of the novel published by Kadokawa was renewed in October, and since then featured a photo of Ikuta. After the cover was revised, the book sold over 100,000 copies. In response to those sales figures, Kadokawa decided that for a limited time period, all 10 Dazai novels would feature Ikuta on the covers; the campaign started on December 15, 2009. It was the first time that the lead actor of a film adaptation of a novel appeared on the covers of all the works written by the author.

Other movies of his in the works are Hanamizuki, co-starring Yui Aragaki and Seaside Motel. Meanwhile, Ikuta began playing the role of Honjo Sadame, a failure of an actor in the drama Unubore Deka along with Johnny senior, Tokio's Tomoya Nagase. On July 27, 2010, Ikuta appeared in Tokio's music video for the song NaNaNa. In 2010, Ikuta appeared on the documentary TV program .

Ikuta has his own mobile diary J-web named Tomagoto (Toma's words). Then temporary, the J-web went by the names Tomagoto, Tomagoto Hyper, and Tomagoto Neo, before officially becoming a permanent J-web on December 15, 2007. Aside from the J-web, he also has his own corner on Wink Up Magazine titled Ikuta Toma no Ikita Kotoba (Toma Ikuta's Words to Live By). On this corner, he writes a one-page essay about things that interest him, as well as his daily experiences. Pictures taken from his own camera are included on the page. Ikuta was the male lead role for the manga Bokura Ga Ita where he played Yano and has a relationship with Yoshitaka Yuriko (Takahashi). The shoot for the movie started in May 2011, and was released as a two-part film in spring 2012.

Personal life
Ikuta married actress Nana Seino on June 1, 2020. They welcomed their first child on March 9, 2022.

Filmography

Television

Films

Musicals
Stand By Me
Kyo-To-Kyo
Shock is Millennium Shock
Susanoh
Another (Kansai Jr.2002 version)
Shock is Real Shock
Vacation (Shonentai Playzone 2003)
Edogah-san Yukuefumei
Mama Loves Mambo III
West Side Story 2004 (Shonentai version)
West Side Story 2005 (Arashi version)
Azumi on Stage (2005)
Azumi Returns (Azumi 2) (2006)
Cat in the Red Boots (Shinkansen Nexus Volume 2) (2006)
Shock – Endless Shock 2007
The Two Gentlemen of Verona – October 2007
Grease – 2008
 My Friend Hitler and Madame de Sade (Mishima Double)- February 2011
 Kamome(The Seagull)- September 2013
 Vamp Bamboo Burn – 2016

Awards
54th Television Drama Academy Awards: Best Supporting Actor (Hanazakari no Kimitachi e)
Nikkan Sports Drama Grand Prix, Winter 2007: Best Supporting Actor (Honey & Clover)
11th Nikkan Sports Drama Grand Prix, April 2007 – March 2008: Best Supporting Actor (Hanazakari no Kimitachi e)
84th Kinema Junpo Awards 2011: Best New Actor (No Longer Human)
Blue Ribbon Awards 2011: Rookie of the Year (No Longer Human)
13th Tokyo Drama Award: Best Actor (If Talking Paid)

References

External links
Johnny profile 

1984 births
Japanese male actors
Japanese idols
Japanese television personalities
Living people
Johnny & Associates
21st-century Japanese singers
21st-century Japanese male singers
Horikoshi High School alumni